The Crooked River is a tributary of the Missouri River in west-central Missouri in the United States. The stream has also been known historically as "Big Creek," "Little River" and "Tiger River." The Crooked River was named for its meandering disposition. Big Creek refers to the stream's status as the largest tributary to the Missouri River in the county.

The Crooked River headwaters arise approximately four miles southeast of Lathrop just east of I-35 in southeastern Clinton County and flows generally southeastwardly through the southwest corner of Caldwell and Ray counties.

Location

Mouth Confluence with the Missouri River, Ray County, Missouri: 
Source Clinton County, Missouri:

See also
List of Missouri rivers

References

Columbia Gazetteer of North America entry
DeLorme (2002).  Missouri Atlas & Gazetteer.  Yarmouth, Maine: DeLorme.  .

Rivers of Missouri
Tributaries of the Missouri River
Rivers of Caldwell County, Missouri
Rivers of Clinton County, Missouri
Rivers of Ray County, Missouri
Significant places in Mormonism